The Marley House is a historic homestead located near Staley, Randolph County, North Carolina.  The house dates to about 1816, and is a two-story vernacular dwelling of frame and log construction.  A one-story, gable-roofed frame rear wing was added in the 1840s or 1850s, then enlarged about 1920.  Also on the property are the contributing well house (c. 1880), garage (c. 1920), smokehouse and woodshed (c. 1920), livestock barn (c. 1910–1920), and Marley's Mill Dam (c. 1790).

It was added to the National Register of Historic Places in 1990.

References

Houses on the National Register of Historic Places in North Carolina
Houses completed in 1816
Houses in Randolph County, North Carolina
National Register of Historic Places in Randolph County, North Carolina
1816 establishments in North Carolina